Alexander Felszeghy (28 October 1933 in Košice –  20 December 1994 in Košice) was a Slovak football defender or midfielder, and later coach. He started his professional career in Army team Tankista Prague (1954–1955) and kept on in Spartak Košice (1956), Tatran Prešov (1957–1960) and ended in Jednota/VSS Košice (1960–1966). Felszeghy overall made 141 appearances and scored three goals at the Czechoslovak First League.

On 13 November 1955, Felszeghy earned his only cap for the Czechoslovakia national football team in a 0–3 defeat against Bulgaria at Vasil Levski National Stadium.

External links
Alexander Felszeghy at The Football Association of the Czech Republic

1933 births
1994 deaths
Sportspeople from Košice
Slovak footballers
Czechoslovak footballers
Czechoslovakia international footballers
FC VSS Košice players
1. FC Tatran Prešov players
Slovak football managers
FC VSS Košice managers
Association football midfielders
Association football defenders